Anastasiia Novikova (born 30 July 1997) is a Ukrainian sambist. She is 2019 European Games silver medalist in women's sambo.

References 

1995 births
Living people
Ukrainian sambo practitioners
Sambo practitioners at the 2019 European Games
European Games medalists in sambo
European Games silver medalists for Ukraine